Bjerke Travbane is a harness racing track located in the Bjerkebanen neighborhood of the Bjerke borough in Oslo, Norway. Owned by Norwegian Trotting Association, its tote betting is handled by Norsk Rikstoto. The venue opened in 1928 and is the busiest harness racetrack in Norway, with 115 racedays in 2012.

Notable race
 Oslo Grand Prix

References

External links

 Official website

Sports venues in Oslo
Harness racing venues in Norway
Sports venues completed in 1928
1928 establishments in Norway